

References
List of Winners of Sección Especial 1975-2001.

Valencian culture